James B. McCoy (April 22, 1839 – 1911) was a member of the Wisconsin State Assembly.

Biography
McCoy was born on April 22, 1839 in Peoria, Illinois. He attended what is now the University of Wisconsin-Platteville. During the American Civil War, McCoy served with the 25th Wisconsin Volunteer Infantry Regiment of the Union Army. Originally an enlisted man, he achieved the rank of first lieutenant. He died of an intestinal ailment in late July or early August 1911.

Political career
McCoy was elected to the Assembly in 1886 and 1888. Previously, he had been elected Sheriff of Grant County, Wisconsin in 1874. He was a Republican.

References

Politicians from Peoria, Illinois
People from Platteville, Wisconsin
Republican Party members of the Wisconsin State Assembly
Wisconsin sheriffs
People of Wisconsin in the American Civil War
Union Army officers
Union Army soldiers
University of Wisconsin–Platteville alumni
1839 births
1911 deaths